Camille Fournier is known for being the former chief technology officer of Rent The Runway, former vice president of technology at Goldman Sachs, and author of The Manager's Path: A Guide for Tech Leaders Navigating Growth and Change. She is a managing director at JPMorgan Chase.

Career 
Fournier earned her bachelor's degree in computer science from Carnegie Mellon University. After graduating, she worked at Microsoft for 18 months. In 2005, she graduated from the University of Wisconsin–Madison with a master's degree in computer science. She moved on to work at Goldman Sachs in New York for over six years, originally as an engineer working on credit risk software and eventually as a vice president of technology.

In 2011, Fournier joined the startup Rent the Runway as the director of engineering, and in 2014 she became the company's chief technology officer. She resigned from her chief position in 2015.

Fournier writes the Ask The CTO column for O'Reilly Media. In 2017, she published a book titled The Manager's Path: A Guide for Tech Leaders Navigating Growth and Change. In 2019, she published a book as the editor titled 97 Things Every Engineering Manager Should Know: Collective Wisdom from the Experts.

References 

Living people
Carnegie Mellon University alumni
University of Wisconsin–Madison College of Letters and Science alumni
Goldman Sachs people
American women engineers
American chief technology officers
American technology writers
American business writers
Women business writers
Year of birth missing (living people)